Saronida is a seaside resort village and former community in East Attica, Greece. Since the 2011 local government reform it is part of the municipality Saronikos, of which it is a municipal unit. The municipal unit has an area of 6.670 km2.

Geography

Saronida is located on the Saronic Gulf coast, in the southeastern part of the Attica peninsula. It lies on the western foot of the Olympos hill. It is 2 km northwest of Anavyssos, 10 km south of Kalyvia Thorikou and 31 km southeast of Athens city centre. Greek National Road 91 (Athens - Sounio) passes through the town.

Saronida is connected to Athens by bus services.

Historical population

References

External links

Greek Travel Pages

Populated places in East Attica
Populated coastal places in Greece